Metro Nashville Public Schools, or MNPS, is a school district that serves the city of Nashville, Tennessee and Davidson County. As of the 2020–21 school year more than 80,000 students were enrolled in the district's 162 schools.

Demographics 
The public schools are not demographically representative of the county they serve. While the county has  61.7% non-Hispanic White residents, the district has only 28% of its students from that group. The county has about 27% Black residents, but the student body is 44% Black.

History 
Metro Nashville Public Schools traces its roots to 1855, when Hume School opened its doors. In 1963, Metropolitan Nashville Public Schools officially formed with the unification of Nashville and Davidson County schools. The district today includes 155 schools, offering instruction from Pre-Kindergarten through 12th grade, with high schools also offering college-level credits.

Academics

More than 99 percent of MNPS teachers meet federal standards in at least one subject, with 98.90 percent of classes taught by a highly qualified instructor. The average teacher experience is 13.0 years at the elementary level, 11.5 years at the middle school level, and 14.0 years at the high school level. A total of 39.83 percent of MNPS teachers have a bachelor's degree, 36.67 percent have a master's degree, 18.81 percent have Master's plus, and 4.6 percent have a doctorate degree.

Current enrollment reflects a diverse spectrum of backgrounds. Students represent more than 100 countries  and speak languages from more than 100 language groups. MNPS currently has the International Baccalaureate programs in nine schools. Also of note are the magnet schools Hume-Fogg, Nashville School of the Arts, and Martin Luther King.

Administration

Board of Education 
The Board of Education is composed of nine elected members, each serving 4-year terms, and each coming from one of the nine districts in the city. The current board members are:

 District 1: Dr. Sharon Gentry
 District 2: Rachael Anne Elrod, Vice Chair
 District 3: Emily Masters
 District 4: John Little
 District 5: Christiane Buggs, Chair
 District 6: Fran Bush
 District 7: Freda Player-Peters
 District 8: Gini Pupo-Walker
 District 9: Abigail Tyler

Director of Schools 
The Board of Education hires a Director of Schools to oversee daily operations of the schools in Nashville.

As of 2019, Dr. Adrienne Battle is the Director of Schools for MNPS.

References

1855 establishments in Tennessee
Education in Nashville, Tennessee
School districts established in 1855
School districts in Tennessee